Center Township is a township in Russell County, Kansas, United States. As of the 2010 United States Census, it had a population of 221.

Geography
The township lies in the Smoky Hills region of the Great Plains. The western third of Wilson Lake lies in northeastern Center Township. Elm Creek, which drains into the lake, flows north through the northeast part of the township. Cedar Creek, a tributary of the Saline River, runs northeast through the northwest part of the township. In the south, the Smoky Hill River flows generally east through the township, joined by one of its tributaries, Beaver Creek, which runs northeast.

Located in east-central Russell County, it includes the city of Bunker Hill, which is located in the northwest part of the township, and it borders Waldo and Luray Townships to the north, Fairview Township to the northeast, Plymouth Township to the east, Barton County's Beaver and Union Townships to the south, Fairfield Township to the southwest, and Grant and Russell Townships to the west.

Demographics

As of the 2010 census, there were 221 people, 113 households, and 63 families residing in the township. The racial makeup of the township was 99.1% White, 0.5% Asian, and 0.5% from some other race. Hispanic or Latino of any race were 0.5% of the population.

There were 113 households, out of which 15.0% had children under the age of 18 living with them, 48.7% were married couples living together, 1.8% had a male householder with no wife present, 5.3% had a female householder with no husband present, and 44.2% were non-families. 40.7% of all households were made up of individuals, and 23.9% had someone living alone who was 65 years of age or older. The average household size was 1.96, and the average family size was 2.56.

In the township, the population was spread out, with 13.6% under the age of 18, 4.0% from 18 to 24, 11.8% from 25 to 44, 38.9% from 45 to 64, and 31.7% who were 65 years of age or older. The median age was 54.9 years. For every 100 females, there were 114.6 males. For every 100 females age 18 and over, there were 107.6 males age 18 and over.

Education
Center Township lies within unified school district 407, Russell County Schools.

Transportation
Interstate 70 and U.S. Route 40 run concurrently east–west through Center Township, interchanging with Bunker Hill-Luray Road, a paved north–south county road, less than a mile south of Bunker Hill. South of I-70, Bunker Hill-Luray road becomes Bunker Hill-Hoisington Road. A network of mostly unpaved county roads is laid out across the township in a rough grid pattern. The old alignment of U.S. 40, now a paved county road, runs east–west immediately south of and parallel to I-70. North of Bunker Hill, Anspaugh Road, an unpaved county road, runs east then northeast toward Wilson Lake, turning into the paved Shoreline Road, which runs southeast and east, roughly parallel to the southern shoreline of the lake. Less than a mile north of the Smoky Hill River, 4 Corners Road, a paved east–west road, enters the county from the west and terminates at its junction with Bunker Hill-Hoisington Road. Less than a mile south of the Smoky Hill, Lincoln Lane, another paved road, runs east–west through the township.

The Kansas Pacific line of the Union Pacific Railroad runs windingly east through Bunker Hill and the northern part of the township.

References

Townships in Russell County, Kansas
Townships in Kansas